Ian Anthony Hamilton-Smith, 3rd Baron Colwyn  (born 1 January 1942), commonly known as Anthony Hamilton-Smith, is a peer, dentist and politician. He was one of 90 hereditary peers elected to remain in the House of Lords after the House of Lords Act 1999, sitting as a Conservative. He retired from the House of Lords on 21 July 2022.

The son of the 2nd Baron Colwyn was educated at Cheltenham College, at St Bartholomew's Hospital and at the Royal Dental Hospital. He was further educated at the University of London, where he graduated with a Bachelor of Dental Surgery (BDS) and a Licentiate in Dental Surgery (LDS) in 1966, and became a member of the Royal College of Surgeons of England. In the same year, he succeeded to his father's titles.

Lord Colwyn worked as dentist from 1965 to 2005 and was Chair of the Dental Protection Ltd (a professional support organisation) from 1995 to 2001. He was non-executive director of the Medical Protection Society between 1989 and 2002, and of Project Hope between 1996 and 2001. He is also bandleader of the Lord Colwyn Organisation. In 1998 and 1999, Hamilton-Smith was chair of the radiostation Raw FM, and of Banbury Local Radio from 2003 to 2005. From 2005 to 2008 he was chair of Campbell Montague International and of Dental Sedation Practice.
Due to commitments at the House of Lords, Lord Colwyn stepped down as chairman of Campbell Montague International in 2008.

Hamilton-Smith was a member of the Eastman Research Institute Trust from 1990 to 2001. Since 2004, he is trustee of the Portman Estate. He is further a Fellow of the Industry and Parliament Trust and a Member of the Royal Society of Medicine. Between 1999 and 2001, he was a Fellow of the Institute of Directors.

Between 1988 and 2005, Lord Colwyn was President of the Natural Medicines Society, between 1991 and 1998 of the Huntington's Disease Association and between 1993 and 1998 of the Society for Advancement of Anaesthesia in Dentistry. He was further President of the Arterial Health Foundation from 1993 to 2004, of the Metropolitan Branch of the British Dental Association (BDA) in 1994 and 1995, and finally Council Member of the Medical Protection Society from 1994 to 2001. Having been invested as a Commander of the Order of the British Empire (CBE) in 1989, he became a Fellow of the British Dental Association in 2005. Lord Colwyn is also joint chair of the All Party Parliamentary Jazz Appreciation Group.

Hamilton-Smith has married twice. Firstly Sonia Jane Morgan in 1964, and after their divorce in 1976, he married secondly Nicola Jeanne Tyers in 1977. He has one son, Craig Peter Hamilton-Smith, and one daughter, Jacqueline Jane Hamilton-Smith (married to Sean Pertwee), by his first wife and two daughters, Kirsten Antonia Hamilton-Smith and Tanya Nicole Hamilton-Smith, by his second wife.

References

1942 births
Living people
Barons in the Peerage of the United Kingdom
Commanders of the Order of the British Empire
Conservative Party (UK) hereditary peers
English dentists
People educated at Cheltenham College
Alumni of the University of London
Alumni of the Medical College of St Bartholomew's Hospital
Hereditary peers elected under the House of Lords Act 1999